An icon is a religious work of art, most commonly a painting, in the cultures of the Eastern Orthodox, Oriental Orthodox, and Catholic churches. They are not simply artworks; "an icon is a sacred image used in religious devotion". The most common subjects include Christ, Mary, saints and angels. Although especially associated with portrait-style images concentrating on one or two main figures, the term also covers most of the religious images in a variety of artistic media produced by Eastern Christianity, including narrative scenes, usually from the Bible or the lives of saints.

Icons are most commonly painted on wood panels with egg tempera, but they may also be cast in metal or carved in stone or embroidered on cloth or done in mosaic or fresco work or printed on paper or metal, etc. Comparable images from Western Christianity may be classified as "icons", although "iconic" may also be used to describe the static style of a devotional image. In the Greek language, the term for icon painting uses the same word as for "writing", and Orthodox sources often translate it into English as icon writing.

Eastern Orthodox tradition holds that the production of Christian images dates back to the very early days of Christianity, and that it has been a continuous tradition since then. Modern academic art history considers that, while images may have existed earlier, the tradition can be traced back only as far as the 3rd century, and that the images which survive from Early Christian art often differ greatly from later ones. The icons of later centuries can be linked, often closely, to images from the 5th century onwards, though very few of these survive. Widespread destruction of images occurred during the Byzantine Iconoclasm of 726–842, although this did settle permanently the question of the appropriateness of images. Since then, icons have had a great continuity of style and subject, far greater than in the icons of the Western church. At the same time there have been change and development.

History

Emergence of the icon

Pre-Christian religions had produced and used art works. Statues and paintings of various gods and deities were regularly worshiped and venerated. It is unclear when Christians took up such activities. Christian tradition dating from the 8th century identifies Luke the Evangelist as the first icon painter, but this might not reflect historical facts. A general assumption that early Christianity was generally aniconic, opposed to religious imagery in both theory and practice until about 200, has been challenged by Paul Corby Finney's analysis of early Christian writing and material remains (1994). This distinguishes three different sources of attitudes affecting early Christians on the issue: "first that humans could have a direct vision of God; second that they could not; and, third, that although humans could see God they were best advised not to look, and were strictly forbidden to represent what they had seen". 

These derived respectively from Greek and Near Eastern pagan religions, from Ancient Greek philosophy, and from the Jewish tradition and the Old Testament. Of the three, Finney concludes that "overall, Israel's aversion to sacred images influenced early Christianity considerably less than the Greek philosophical tradition of invisible deity apophatically defined", so placing less emphasis on the Jewish background of most of the first Christians than most traditional accounts. 

Finney suggests that "the reasons for the non-appearance of Christian art before 200 have nothing to do with principled aversion to art, with other-worldliness, or with anti-materialism. The truth is simple and mundane: Christians lacked land and capital. Art requires both. As soon as they began to acquire land and capital, Christians began to experiment with their own distinctive forms of art".

Aside from the legend that Pilate had made an image of Christ, the 4th-century Eusebius of Caesarea, in his Church History, provides a more substantial reference to a "first" icon of Jesus. He relates that King Abgar of Edessa (died ) sent a letter to Jesus at Jerusalem, asking Jesus to come and heal him of an illness.  This version of the Abgar story does not mention an image. A later account found in the Syriac Doctrine of Addai mentions a painted image of Jesus in the story. Even later, in the 6th-century account given by Evagrius Scholasticus, the painted image transforms into an image that miraculously appeared on a towel when Christ pressed the cloth to his wet face. Further legends relate that the cloth remained in Edessa until the 10th century, when it was taken by General John Kourkouas to Constantinople. It went missing in 1204 when Crusaders sacked Constantinople, but by then numerous copies had firmly established its iconic type.

The 4th-century Christian Aelius Lampridius produced the earliest known written records of Christian images treated like icons (in a pagan or Gnostic context) in his Life of Alexander Severus (xxix) that formed part of the Augustan History. According to Lampridius, the emperor Alexander Severus, himself not a Christian, had kept a domestic chapel for the veneration of images of deified emperors, of portraits of his ancestors, and of Christ, Apollonius, Orpheus and Abraham. Saint Irenaeus, in his Against Heresies (1:25;6) says scornfully of the Gnostic Carpocratians:

On the other hand, Irenaeus does not speak critically of icons or portraits in a general sense—only of certain gnostic sectarians' use of icons.

Another criticism of image veneration appears in the non-canonical 2nd-century Acts of John (generally considered a gnostic work), in which the Apostle John discovers that one of his followers has had a portrait made of him, and is venerating it:

Later in the passage John says, "But this that you have now done is childish and imperfect: you have drawn a dead likeness of the dead."

At least some of the hierarchy of the Christian churches still strictly opposed icons in the early 4th century. At the Spanish non-ecumenical Synod of Elvira bishops concluded, "Pictures are not to be placed in churches, so that they do not become objects of worship and adoration".

Bishop Epiphanius of Salamis, wrote his letter 51 to John, Bishop of Jerusalem in which he recounted how he tore down an image in a church and admonished the other bishop that such images are "opposed[...] to our religion".

Elsewhere in his Church History, Eusebius reports seeing what he took to be portraits of Jesus, Peter and Paul, and also mentions a bronze statue at Banias / Paneas under Mount Hermon, of which he wrote, "They say that this statue is an image of Jesus". Further, he relates that locals regarded the image as a memorial of the healing of the woman with an issue of blood by Jesus (Luke 8:43–48), because it depicted a standing man wearing a double cloak and with arm outstretched, and a woman kneeling before him with arms reaching out as if in supplication. 

John Francis Wilson suggests the possibility that this refers to a pagan bronze statue whose true identity had been forgotten. Some have thought it to represent Aesculapius, the Greek god of healing, but the description of the standing figure and the woman kneeling in supplication precisely matches images found on coins depicting the bearded emperor Hadrian reaching out to a female figure—symbolizing a  province—kneeling before him.

When asked by Constantia (Emperor Constantine's half-sister) for an image of Jesus, Eusebius denied the request, replying: "To depict purely the human form of Christ before its transformation, on the other hand, is to break the commandment of God and to fall into pagan error." Hence Jaroslav Pelikan calls Eusebius "the father of iconoclasm".

After the emperor Constantine I extended official toleration of Christianity within the Roman Empire in 313, huge numbers of pagans became converts. This period of Christianization probably saw the use of Christian images became very widespread among the faithful, though with great differences from pagan habits.

When Constantine himself apparently converted to Christianity, the majority of his subjects remained pagans. The Roman Imperial cult of the divinity of the emperor, expressed through the traditional burning of candles and the offering of incense to the emperor's image, was tolerated for a period because it would have been politically dangerous to attempt to suppress it. In the 5th century the courts of justice and municipal buildings of the empire still honoured the portrait of the reigning emperor in this way.

In 425 Philostorgius, an allegedly Arian Christian, charged the Orthodox Christians in Constantinople with idolatry because they still honored the image of the emperor Constantine the Great in this way. Dix notes that this occurred more than a century before the first extant reference to a similar honouring of the image of Christ or of his apostles or saints known today, but that it would seem a natural progression for the image of Christ, the King of Heaven and Earth, to be paid similar veneration as that given to the earthly Roman emperor. However, the Orthodox, Eastern Catholics, and other groups insist on explicitly distinguishing the veneration of icons from the worship of idols by pagans.

Theodosius to Justinian

After adoption of Christianity as the only permissible Roman state religion under Theodosius I, Christian art began to change not only in quality and sophistication, but also in nature. This was in no small part due to Christians being free for the first time to express their faith openly without persecution from the state, in addition to the faith spreading to the non-poor segments of society. Paintings of martyrs and their feats began to appear, and early writers commented on their lifelike effect, one of the elements a few Christian writers criticized in pagan art—the ability to imitate life. The writers mostly criticized pagan works of art for pointing to false gods, thus encouraging idolatry. Statues in the round were avoided as being too close to the principal artistic focus of pagan cult practices, as they have continued to be (with some small-scale exceptions) throughout the history of Eastern Christianity.

Nilus of Sinai, in his Letter to Heliodorus Silentiarius, records a miracle in which St. Plato of Ankyra appeared to a Christian in a dream. The Saint was recognized because the young man had often seen his portrait. This recognition of a religious apparition from likeness to an image was also a characteristic of pagan pious accounts of appearances of gods to humans, and was a regular topos in hagiography. One critical recipient of a vision from Saint Demetrius of Thessaloniki apparently specified that the saint resembled the "more ancient" images of him—presumably the 7th-century mosaics still in Hagios Demetrios. Another, an African bishop, had been rescued from Arab slavery by a young soldier called Demetrios, who told him to go to his house in Thessaloniki. Having discovered that most young soldiers in the city seemed to be called Demetrios, he gave up and went to the largest church in the city, to find his rescuer on the wall.

During this period the church began to discourage all non-religious human images—the Emperor and donor figures counting as religious. This became largely effective, so that most of the population would only ever see religious images and those of the ruling class. The word icon referred to any and all images, not just religious ones, but there was barely a need for a separate word for these.

Luke's portrait of Mary
It is in a context attributed to the 5th century that the first mention of an image of Mary painted from life appears, though earlier paintings on catacomb walls bear resemblance to modern icons of Mary. Theodorus Lector, in his 6th-century History of the Church 1:1 stated that Eudokia (wife of emperor Theodosius II,  460) sent an image of the "Mother of God" named Icon of the Hodegetria from Jerusalem to Pulcheria, daughter of Arcadius, the former emperor and father of Theodosius II. The image was specified to have been "painted by the Apostle Luke."

Margherita Guarducci relates a tradition that the original icon of Mary attributed to Luke, sent by Eudokia to Pulcheria from Palestine, was a large circular icon only of her head. When the icon arrived in Constantinople it was fitted in as the head into a very large rectangular icon of her holding the Christ child and it is this composite icon that became the one historically known as the Hodegetria. She further states another tradition that when the last Latin Emperor of Constantinople, Baldwin II, fled Constantinople in 1261 he took this original circular portion of the icon with him.

This remained in the possession of the Angevin dynasty who had it inserted into a much larger image of Mary and the Christ child, which is presently enshrined above the high altar of the Benedictine Abbey church of Montevergine. This icon was subjected to repeated repainting over the subsequent centuries, so that it is difficult to determine what the original image of Mary's face would have looked like. Guarducci states that in 1950 an ancient image of Mary at the Church of Santa Francesca Romana was determined to be a very exact, but reverse mirror image of the original circular icon that was made in the 5th century and brought to Rome, where it has remained until the present.

In later tradition the number of icons of Mary attributed to Luke greatly multiplied. The Salus Populi Romani, the Theotokos of Vladimir, the Theotokos Iverskaya of Mount Athos, the Theotokos of Tikhvin, the Theotokos of Smolensk and the Black Madonna of Częstochowa are examples, and another is in the cathedral on St Thomas Mount, which is believed to be one of the seven painted by St. Luke the Evangelist and brought to India by St. Thomas. Ethiopia has at least seven more. Bissera V. Pentcheva concludes, "The myth [of Luke painting an icon] was invented in order to support the legitimacy of icon veneration during the Iconoclastic controversy" [8th and 9th centuries, much later than most art historians put it]. By claiming the existence of a portrait of the Theotokos painted during her lifetime by the evangelist Luke, the iconodules "fabricated evidence for the apostolic origins and divine approval of images."

In the period before and during the Iconoclastic Controversy, stories attributing the creation of icons to the New Testament period greatly increased, with several apostles and even Mary herself believed to have acted as the artist or commissioner of images (also embroidered in the case of Mary).

Iconoclast period

There was a continuing opposition to images and their misuse within Christianity from very early times. "Whenever images threatened to gain undue influence within the church, theologians have sought to strip them of their power".  Further, "there is no century between the fourth and the eighth in which there is not some evidence of opposition to images even within the Church". Nonetheless, popular favor for icons guaranteed their continued existence, while no systematic apologia for or against icons, or doctrinal authorization or condemnation of icons yet existed.

The use of icons was seriously challenged by Byzantine Imperial authority in the 8th century. Though by this time opposition to images was strongly entrenched in Judaism and Islam, attribution of the impetus toward an iconoclastic movement in Eastern Orthodoxy to Muslims or Jews "seems to have been highly exaggerated, both by contemporaries and by modern scholars".

Though significant in the history of religious doctrine, the Byzantine controversy over images is not seen as of primary importance in Byzantine history; "[f]ew historians still hold it to have been the greatest issue of the period".

The Iconoclastic Period began when images were banned by Emperor Leo III the Isaurian sometime between 726 and 730. Under his son Constantine V, a council forbidding image veneration was held at Hieria near Constantinople in 754. Image veneration was later reinstated by the Empress Regent Irene, under whom another council was held reversing the decisions of the previous iconoclast council and taking its title as Seventh Ecumenical Council. The council anathemized all who hold to iconoclasm, i.e. those who held that veneration of images constitutes idolatry. Then the ban was enforced again by Leo V in 815. Finally, icon veneration was decisively restored by Empress Regent Theodora in 843 at the Council of Constantinople.

From then on all Byzantine coins had a religious image or symbol on the reverse, usually an image of Christ for larger denominations, with the head of the Emperor on the obverse, reinforcing the bond of the state and the divine order.

Acheiropoieta

Such images functioned as powerful relics as well as icons, and their images were naturally seen as especially authoritative as to the true appearance of the subject: naturally and especially because of the reluctance to accept mere human productions as embodying anything of the divine, a commonplace of Christian deprecation of man-made "idols". Like icons believed to be painted directly from the live subject, they therefore acted as important references for other images in the tradition. Beside the developed legend of the mandylion or Image of Edessa was the tale of the Veil of Veronica, whose very name signifies "true icon" or "true image", the fear of a "false image" remaining strong.

Stylistic developments

Although there are earlier records of their use, no panel icons earlier than the few from the 6th century preserved at the Greek Orthodox Saint Catherine's Monastery in Egypt survive, as the other examples in Rome have all been drastically over-painted. The surviving evidence for the earliest depictions of Christ, Mary and saints therefore comes from wall-paintings, mosaics and some carvings. They are realistic in appearance, in contrast to the later stylization. They are broadly similar in style, though often much superior in quality, to the mummy portraits done in wax (encaustic) and found at Fayyum in Egypt. 

As can be judged from such items, the first depictions of Jesus were generic, rather than portrait images, generally representing him as a beardless young man. It was some time before the earliest examples of the long-haired, bearded face that was later to become standardized as the image of Jesus appeared. When they did begin to appear there was still variation. Augustine of Hippo (354–430) said that no one knew the appearance of Jesus or that of Mary. However, Augustine was not a resident of the Holy Land and therefore was not familiar with the local populations and their oral traditions. Gradually, paintings of Jesus took on characteristics of portrait images.

At this time the manner of depicting Jesus was not yet uniform, and there was some controversy over which of the two most common icons was to be favored. The first or "Semitic" form showed Jesus with short and "frizzy" hair; the second showed a bearded Jesus with hair parted in the middle, the manner in which the god Zeus was depicted. Theodorus Lector remarked that of the two, the one with short and frizzy hair was "more authentic". To support his assertion, he relates a story (excerpted by John of Damascus) that a pagan commissioned to paint an image of Jesus used the "Zeus" form instead of the "Semitic" form, and that as punishment his hands withered.

Though their development was gradual, it is possible to date the full-blown appearance and general ecclesiastical (as opposed to simply popular or local) acceptance of Christian images as venerated and miracle-working objects to the 6th century, when, as Hans Belting writes, "we first hear of the church's use of religious images". "As we reach the second half of the sixth century, we find that images are attracting direct veneration and some of them are credited with the performance of miracles". Cyril Mango writes, "In the post-Justinianic period the icon assumes an ever increasing role in popular devotion, and there is a proliferation of miracle stories connected with icons, some of them rather shocking to our eyes". However, the earlier references by Eusebius and Irenaeus indicate veneration of images and reported miracles associated with them as early as the 2nd century.

Symbolism
In the icons of Eastern Orthodoxy, and of the Early Medieval West, very little room is made for artistic license. Almost everything within the image has a symbolic aspect. Christ, the saints, and the angels all have halos. Angels (and often John the Baptist) have wings because they are messengers. Figures have consistent facial appearances, hold attributes personal to them, and use a few conventional poses.  Archangels bear a thin staff and sometimes a mirror.

Colour plays an important role as well. Gold represents the radiance of Heaven; red, divine life. Blue is the colour of human life, white is the Uncreated Light of God, only used for resurrection and transfiguration of Christ. In icons of Jesus and Mary, Jesus wears red undergarment with a blue outer garment (representing God becoming human) and Mary wears a blue undergarment with a red overgarment (representing a human who was granted gifts by God), and thus the doctrine of deification is conveyed by icons. Letters are symbols too. Most icons incorporate some calligraphic text naming the person or event depicted. Even this is often presented in a stylized manner.

Miracles

In the Eastern Orthodox Christian tradition there are reports of particular wonderworking icons that exude myrrh (fragrant, healing oil), or perform miracles upon petition by believers. When such reports are verified by the Orthodox hierarchy, they are understood as miracles performed by God through the prayers of the saint, rather than being magical properties of the painted wood itself. Theologically, all icons are considered to be sacred, and are miraculous by nature, being a means of spiritual communion between the heavenly and earthly realms. 

However, it is not uncommon for specific icons to be characterised as "miracle-working", meaning that God has chosen to glorify them by working miracles through them. Such icons are often given particular names (especially those of the Virgin Mary), and even taken from city to city where believers gather to venerate them and pray before them. Islands like that of Tinos are renowned for possessing such "miraculous" icons, and are visited every year by thousands of pilgrims.

Eastern Orthodox teaching
The Eastern Orthodox view of the origin of icons is generally quite different from that of most secular scholars and from some in contemporary Roman Catholic circles:  "The Orthodox Church maintains and teaches that the sacred image has existed from the beginning of Christianity", Léonid Ouspensky has written. Accounts that some non-Orthodox writers consider legendary are accepted as history within Eastern Orthodoxy, because they are a part of church tradition. Thus accounts such as that of the miraculous "image not made by hands", and the weeping and moving "Mother of God of the Sign" of Novgorod are accepted as fact: "Church Tradition tells us, for example, of the existence of an Icon of the Savior during His lifetime (the 'Icon-Made-Without-Hands') and of Icons of the Most-Holy Theotokos [Mary] immediately after Him."

Eastern Orthodoxy further teaches that "a clear understanding of the importance of Icons" was part of the church from its very beginning, and has never changed, although explanations of their importance may have developed over time. Icons also aerved as tools of edification for the illiterate faithful during most of the history of Christendom. Thus, icons are words in painting; they refer to the history of salvation and to its manifestation in concrete persons. In the Orthodox Church, "icons have always been understood as a visible gospel, as a testimony to the great things given man by God the incarnate Logos". In the Council of 860 it was stated that "all that is uttered in words written in syllables is also proclaimed in the language of colors".

Eastern Orthodox find the first instance of an image or icon in the Bible when God made man in his own image (Septuagint Greek ), in Genesis 1:26–27. In Exodus, God commanded that the Israelites not make any graven image; soon afterwards, however, he commanded that they make graven images of cherubim and other like things, both as statues and woven on tapestries. Later, Solomon included still more such imagery when he built the first temple. Eastern Orthodox believe these qualify as icons, in that they were visible images depicting heavenly beings and, in the case of the cherubim, used to indirectly indicate God's presence above the Ark.

In the Book of Numbers it is written that God told Moses to make a bronze serpent, Nehushtan, and hold it up, so that anyone looking at the snake would be healed of their snake bites. In John 3, Jesus refers to the same serpent, saying that he must be lifted up in the same way that the serpent was. John of Damascus also regarded the brazen serpent as an icon. Further, Jesus Christ himself is called the "image of the invisible God" in Colossians 1:15, and is therefore in one sense an icon. As people are also made in God's images, people are also considered to be living icons, and are therefore "censed" along with painted icons during Orthodox prayer services.

According to John of Damascus, anyone who tries to destroy icons "is the enemy of Christ, the Holy Mother of God and the saints, and is the defender of the Devil and his demons". This is because the theology behind icons is closely tied to the Incarnational theology of the humanity and divinity of Jesus, so that attacks on icons typically have the effect of undermining or attacking the Incarnation of Jesus himself as elucidated in the Ecumenical Councils.

Basil of Caesarea, in his writing On the Holy Spirit, says: "The honor paid to the image passes to the prototype". He also illustrates the concept by saying, "If I point to a statue of Caesar and ask you 'Who is that?', your answer would properly be, 'It is Caesar.' When you say such you do not mean that the stone itself is Caesar, but rather, the name and honor you ascribe to the statue passes over to the original, the archetype, Caesar himself." This is thus the approach to icons; to kiss an icon of Jesus, in the Eastern Orthodox view, is to show love towards Jesus himself, not mere wood and paint making up the physical substance of the icon. Worship of the icon as somehow entirely separate from its prototype is expressly forbidden by the Seventh Ecumenical Council.

Icons are often illuminated with a candle or jar of oil with a wick. (Beeswax for candles and olive oil for oil lamps are preferred because they burn very cleanly, although other materials are sometimes used.) The illumination of religious images with lamps or candles is an ancient practice pre-dating Christianity.

Icon painting tradition by region

Byzantine Empire

Of the icon painting tradition that developed in Byzantium, with Constantinople as the chief city, we have only a few icons from the 11th century and none preceding them, in part because of the Iconoclastic reforms during which many were destroyed or lost, and also because of plundering by the Republic of Venice in 1204 during the Fourth Crusade, and finally the Fall of Constantinople in 1453.

It was only in the Komnenian period (1081–1185) that the cult of the icon became widespread in the Byzantine world, partly on account of the dearth of richer materials (such as mosaics, ivory, and vitreous enamels), but also because an iconostasis a special screen for icons was introduced then in ecclesiastical practice. The style of the time was severe, hieratic and distant.

In the late Comnenian period this severity softened, and emotion, formerly avoided, entered icon painting. Major monuments for this change include the murals at Daphni Monastery and the Church of St. Panteleimon near Skopje (1164). The Theotokos of Vladimir is probably the most representative example of the new trend towards spirituality and emotion.

The tendency toward emotionalism in icons continued in the Paleologan period, which began in 1261. Palaiologan art reached its pinnacle in mosaics such as those of Chora Church. In the last half of the 14th century, Palaiologan saints were painted in an exaggerated manner, very slim and in contorted positions – a style known as the Palaiologan Mannerism, of which Ochrid's Annunciation is a superb example.

After 1453, the Byzantine tradition was carried on in regions previously influenced by its religion and culture—in the Balkans, Russia, and other Slavic countries, Georgia and Armenia in the Caucasus, and among Eastern Orthodox minorities in the Islamic world. In the Greek-speaking world Crete, ruled by Venice until the mid-17th century, was an important centre of painted icons, as home of the Cretan School, exporting many to Europe.

Crete

Cretan painting was heavily patronized both by Catholics of Venetian territories and by Eastern Orthodox. For ease of transport, Cretan painters specialized in panel paintings, and developed the ability to work in many styles to fit the taste of various patrons. El Greco, who moved to Venice after establishing his reputation in Crete, is the most famous artist of the school, who continued to use many Byzantine conventions in his works. In 1669 the city of Heraklion, on Crete, which at one time boasted at least 120 painters, fell to the Turks. From that time Greek icon painting went into a decline, with a revival attempted in the 20th century by art reformers such as Photis Kontoglou, who emphasized a return to earlier styles.

Russia

Russian icons are typically paintings on wood, often small, though some in churches and monasteries may be as large as a table top. Many religious homes in Russia have icons hanging on the wall in the —the "red" corner (see Icon corner). There is a rich history and elaborate religious symbolism associated with icons. In Russian churches, the nave is typically separated from the sanctuary by an iconostasis, a wall of icons.

The use and making of icons entered Kievan Rus' following its conversion to Orthodox Christianity from the Eastern Roman (Byzantine) Empire in 988 AD. As a general rule, these icons strictly followed models and formulas hallowed by usage, some of which had originated in Constantinople. As time passed, the Russians—notably Andrei Rublev and Dionisius—widened the vocabulary of iconic types and styles far beyond anything found elsewhere. The personal, improvisatory and creative traditions of Western European religious art are largely lacking in Russia before the 17th century, when Simon Ushakov's painting became strongly influenced by religious paintings and engravings from Protestant as well as Catholic Europe.

In the mid-17th century, changes in liturgy and practice instituted by Patriarch Nikon of Moscow resulted in a split in the Russian Orthodox Church. The traditionalists, the persecuted "Old Ritualists" or "Old Believers", continued the traditional stylization of icons, while the State Church modified its practice. From that time icons began to be painted not only in the traditional stylized and nonrealistic mode, but also in a mixture of Russian stylization and Western European realism, and in a Western European manner very much like that of Catholic religious art of the time. The Stroganov School and the icons from Nevyansk rank among the last important schools of Russian icon-painting.

Romania 

In Romania, icons painted as reversed images behind glass and set in frames were common in the 19th century and are still made. The process is known as reverse glass painting. "In the Transylvanian countryside, the expensive icons on panels imported from Moldavia, Wallachia, and Mt. Athos were gradually replaced by small, locally produced icons on glass, which were much less expensive and thus accessible to the Transylvanian peasants".

Serbia

The earliest historical records about icons in Serbia dates back to the period of Nemanjić dynasty. One of the notable schools of Serb icons was active in the Bay of Kotor from the 17th century to the 19th century.

Trojeručica meaning "Three-handed Theotokos" is the most important icon of the Serbian Orthodox Church and main icon of Mount Athos.

Egypt and Ethiopia

The Coptic Orthodox Church of Alexandria and Oriental Orthodoxy also have distinctive, living icon painting traditions. Coptic icons have their origin in the Hellenistic art of Egyptian Late Antiquity, as exemplified by the Fayum mummy portraits. Beginning in the 4th century, churches painted their walls and made icons to reflect an authentic expression of their faith.

Aleppo

The Aleppo School was a school of icon-painting, founded by the priest Yusuf al-Musawwir (also known as Joseph the Painter) and active in Aleppo, which was then a part of the Ottoman Empire, between at least 1645 and 1777.

Western Christianity
Although the word "icon" is not generally used in Western Christianity, there are religious works of art which were largely patterned on Byzantine works, and equally conventional in composition and depiction. Until the 13th century, icon-like depictions of sacred figures followed Eastern patterns—although very few survive from this early period. Italian examples are in a style known as Italo-Byzantine. 

From the 13th century, the Western tradition came slowly to allow the artist far more flexibility, and a more realist approach to the figures. If only because there was a much smaller number of skilled artists, the quantity of works of art, in the sense of panel paintings, was much smaller in the West, and in most Western settings a single diptych as an altarpiece, or in a domestic room, probably stood in place of the larger collections typical of Orthodox "icon corners".

Only in the 15th century did production of painted works of art begin to approach Eastern levels, supplemented by mass-produced imports from the Cretan School. In this century, the use of icon-like portraits in the West was enormously increased by the introduction of old master prints on paper, mostly woodcuts which were produced in vast numbers (although hardly any survive). They were mostly sold, hand-coloured, by churches, and the smallest sizes (often only an inch high) were affordable even by peasants, who glued or pinned them straight onto a wall.

With the Reformation, after an initial uncertainty among early Lutherans, who painted a few icon-like depictions of leading Reformers, and continued to paint scenes from Scripture, Protestants came down firmly against icon-like portraits, especially larger ones, even of Christ. Many Protestants found these idolatrous.

Catholic Church view
The Catholic Church accepted the decrees of the iconodule Seventh Ecumenical Council regarding images. There is some minor difference, however, in the Catholic attitude to images from that of the Orthodox.

Catholics also, however, share the same viewpoint with the Orthodox when it comes to image veneration, believing that whenever approached, sacred images are to be shown reverence. Though using both flat wooden panel and stretched canvas paintings, Catholics traditionally have also favored images in the form of three-dimensional statuary, whereas in the East, statuary is much less widely employed.

Lutheran view
A joint Lutheran–Orthodox statement made in the 7th Plenary of the Lutheran–Orthodox Joint Commission, in July 1993 in Helsinki, reaffirmed the ecumenical council decisions on the nature of Christ and the veneration of images:

See also
 Analogion
 Christian symbolism
 Early Christian art and architecture
 Holy card
 Iconoclasm
 Orans
 Podea
 Proskynetarion
 Religious image
 Warsaw Icon Museum
 Icon of Christ of Latomos
 Panagia Ierosolymitissa
 Council of Constantinople (843)

Notes

References

Further reading

External links 

"Iconography", at Orthodox Wiki
Orthodox Iconography, by Elias Damianakis
"A Discourse in Iconography" by John of Shanghai and San Francisco, Orthodox Life Vol. 30, No. 1 (January–February 1980), pp. 42–45 (via Archangel Books).
"The Iconic and Symbolic in Orthodox Iconography", at Orthodox Info
"Icon & Worship—Icons of Karakallou Monastery, Mt.Athos" 
Ikonograph – contemporary Byzantine icon studio, iconography school, and Orthodox resources]
"Orthodox Iconography" Theodore Koufos at Ikonograph
"Contemporary Orthodox Byzantine Style Murals" – gallery, at Ikonograph
Iconography Guide – free e-learning site
"On the Difference of Western Religious Art and Orthodox Iconography", by icon painter Paul Azkoul
"Explanation of Orthodox Christian Icons", from Church of the Nativity
"Concerning the Veneration of Icons", from Church of the Nativity
"Holy Icons: Theology in Color", from Antiochian Orthodox Archdiocese
"Icons of Mount Athos", from Macedonian Heritage
"Icons", from Greek Orthodox Archdiocese of America
Icon Art – gallery of icons, murals, and mosaics (mostly Russian) from the 11th to the 20th century
Eikonografos – collection of Byzantine icons
My World of Byzantium by Bob Atchison, on the Deësis icon of Christ at Hagia Sophia, and four galleries of other icons

 
Christian iconography
Christian religious objects
Christian terminology
Eastern Christian liturgical objects
Sacramentals